Park Jung-yeon (born 13 May 1997) is a South Korean actress and model. She made her acting debut in the last episode of tvN's drama Hi Bye, Mama! as the adult Cho Seo-woo and acted her first regular role in TV Chosun's Kingmaker: The Change of Destiny as the future Empress Myeongseong.

Personal life
She is a former trainee of SM Entertainment and was a former member of SM Rookies. In 2019 she left SM and signed with KeyEast to become an actress. Both of her parent are singers and her older sister Park Seung-yeon also known as Dan-A is a singer.

Filmography

Television series

Music video

References

External links 
 
 

1997 births
Living people
21st-century South Korean actresses
Hanyang University alumni
South Korean female models
South Korean television actresses
South Korean film actresses
South Korean web series actresses